Moneda is the second album released by the Dominican Rock group Toque Profundo. Like the first album it too was independently recorded. "Llorare" was covered by Maximo Martinez in the production Rock & Jazz: Turismo Republica Dominicana

Track listing 

 Lloraré
 Viajero
 Ramona
 Ellas
 Tú Me Conoces
 ¿Dónde Estabas Tú?
 Entre la Espada y la Pared
 Selene
 Pases de Amor
 Moneda
 Sácanos los Ojos (Bonus Track)

See also

Toque Profundo official Site, Acerca Del Grupo Section
Toque Profundo

1996 albums
Toque Profundo albums